Hormozan may refer to:
 Hormuzan, governor (satrap) of Susiana in 639

See also
 Hormozgan